Lhotzkyella is a species of plants in the Apocynaceae first described as a genus in 1882. It was originally given the name "Pulvinaria" but this turned out to be an illegitimate homonym, meaning that the name had already been used for a different species (a fungus, in this case).  Lhotzkyella contains only one known species, Lhotzkyella lhotzkyana, endemic to Brazil.

References

Endemic flora of Brazil
Asclepiadoideae
Monotypic Apocynaceae genera